Fray Pedro Simón (San Lorenzo de la Parrilla, Spain, 1574 - Ubaté, New Kingdom of Granada, ca. 1628) was a Spanish franciscan friar, professor and chronicler of the indigenous peoples of modern day Colombia and Venezuela, at the time forming the New Kingdom of Granada. Pedro Simón is one of the most important Muisca scholars forming the basis for later scholars such as Lucas Fernández de Piedrahita, Alexander von Humboldt, Javier Ocampo López and many others.

Biography 
Pedro Simón studied in Cartagena, Spain and went to Cartagena de Indias in 1603. Simón accompanied Juan de Borja and described his war against the Pijao in 1608. On June 3, 1623 he was named Custodio de la Provincia Franciscana del Nuevo Reino de Granada ("custodian of the franciscan province of the New Kingdom of Granada").

In this year he started writing his most notable work Noticias historiales de las conquistas de Tierra Firme en las Indias Occidentales, published in Cuenca, Spain in 1626 or 1627. Later editions were published in Bogotá in 1882–1892, 1953, 1963 and 1982. One part has been published in English under the title "Expedition of Pedro de Ursua and Lope de Aguirre" (London, 1861) and 2010. After finishing this work, Simón settled in the San Diego convent in Ubaté, Cundinamarca, where he died between October 1626 and May 7, 1628.

See also 

List of Muisca scholars
Muisca

References

Bibliography 
 
 
 
 

Spanish Roman Catholic missionaries
17th-century Spanish historians
History of Colombia
History of Venezuela
Muisca scholars
1574 births
Year of death uncertain
Roman Catholic missionaries in Colombia
Spanish Franciscans
Franciscan missionaries